Raemeotherium is an extinct genus of diprotodont marsupial from the late Oligocene Namba Formation of South Australia. It was much smaller than other diprotodonts, approximately the size of a lamb, and comparatively gracile. It is usually placed within the Zygomaturinae, but because the upper third premolar is unknown doubt remains about its affinities.

References

 Long, J., Archer, M., Flannery, T., & Hand, S. (2002) Prehistoric mammals of Australia and New Guinea: One hundred million years of evolution. University of New South Wales Press (page 97)
 Rich, T. H., Archer, M., and Tedford, R. H. (1978) Raemeotherium yatkolai, gen. et sp. nov., a primitive diprotodontid from the medial Miocene of South Australia. Memoirs of The National Museum of Victoria, 39: 85-91 http://biostor.org/reference/102728/page/1

Prehistoric vombatiforms
Oligocene marsupials
Oligocene mammals of Australia
Prehistoric marsupial genera